Julien Kerneur (born 1 November 1991) is a French professional kite surfer. He is sponsored by Ozone Kiteboarding.

In July 2012 he won the gold medal in the Slalom World Championships, finishing in front of Maxime Nocher and Rolf van der Vlugt.

Achievements
Source:

2008
4th PKRA World Tour France (kite cross)
2009
 PKRA World Tour Paros (kite cross)
2010
 PKRA World Tour Thailand (kite cross)
 PKRA World Tour Sankt Peter-Ording (kite cross)
4th PKRA World Tour Fuerteventura (kite cross)
 PKRA World Tour Bariloche (kite cross)

2011
 PKRA World Tour Thailand (kite cross)
 PKRA Word Tour (kite cross)
 PKRA World Tour Sankt Peter-Ording (kite cross)
2012
5th PKRA World Tour Mexico (kite cross)
4th PKRA World Tour The Hague, Scheveningen
6th PKRA World Tour Hyères (kite cross)
 World Championships (slalom)

References

External links
PKRA Profile

1991 births
Living people
French kitesurfers
Male kitesurfers
21st-century French people